Myristica fragrans is an evergreen tree indigenous to the Maluku Islands of Indonesia. It is important as the main source of the spices nutmeg and mace. It is widely grown across the tropics including Guangdong and Yunnan in China, Taiwan, Indonesia, Malaysia, Grenada in the Caribbean, Kerala in India, Sri Lanka and South America.

Description

The species is dioecious, i.e. "male" or staminate flowers and "female" or carpellate flowers are borne on different plants, although occasional individuals produce both kinds of flower. The flowers are bell-shaped, pale yellow and somewhat waxy and fleshy.

The fruit has a fleshy husk. When ripe the husk splits into two halves along a ridge running the length of the fruit. The seed is the source of nutmeg, the aril the source of mace.

Taxonomy

Myristica fragrans was given a binomial name by the Dutch botanist Maartyn Houttuyn in 1774. It had earlier been described by Georg Eberhard Rumphius, among others. The specific epithet fragrans means "fragrant".

References

fragrans
Plants described in 1774
Taxa named by Martinus Houttuyn